Manak Nagar Railway Inter College is a government higher secondary school located in RDSO Colony, Manak Nagar, Lucknow.

References

Intermediate colleges in Uttar Pradesh
Schools in Lucknow
Educational institutions in India with year of establishment missing